Teura'itera'i Tupaia (born 6 February 2000) is a French Polynesian athlete specialising in the Javelin throw. He is the younger brother of French athlete Kevin Mayer.

Biography
Tupaia was born in Papeete in French Polynesia, and began athletics at the age of 11. He participated in the athletics section of A.S. Aorai in French Polynesia until 2019. In 2020 he moved to France where he competed with the Entente de Haute-Alsace.

In 2020, he won silver at the 2020 French Athletics Championships in Albi with a throw of 73.07 m (personal record).

He won gold in the under-23 category at the 2021 European Throwing Cup in Split with a throw of 80.46m, a mark above 80 meters that had not been reached by a French thrower since 2010 and 30 centimeters from the French record held by Stéphane Laporte. He withdrew from the 2021 European team championships due to an elbow injury.

He won gold in the javelin competition at the 2021 French Athletics Championships in Angers.

He won gold at the 2022 European Throwing Cup in Leiria.

References

Living people
2000 births
People from Papeete
French Polynesian javelin throwers
French male javelin throwers